The China Press, commonly called Qiaobao, is a Chinese-language newspaper published in the United States. 

The China Press was founded in 1990 by personnel dispatched to the U.S. from the Overseas Chinese Affairs Office and its China News Service to counter negative perceptions of the Chinese government following the 1989 Tiananmen Square protests and massacre. The China Press is formally owned by Asian Culture and Media Group, which also owns SinoVision.

Former China News Service journalist, Xie Yining, served as chairman of The China Press until his killing by another newspaper employee in 2018. 

According to academic Wanning Sun, The China Press, along with The Epoch Times, World Journal, Sing Tao, and Ming Pao, are the major newspapers serving overseas Chinese communities in the United States and Canada. Unlike other newspapers linked to Chinese state media, The China Press has been noted as not having registered under the Foreign Agents Registration Act (FARA).

Reception

Chinese Communist Party Influence
A 2001 report on Chinese media censorship by the Jamestown Foundation cited The China Press as one of four major overseas Chinese newspapers directly or indirectly controlled by the Chinese government.

The dominant Chinese media vehicle in America is the newspaper," wrote the report's lead author Mei Duzhe. "Four major Chinese newspapers are found in the U.S.—World Journal, Sing Tao Daily, Ming Pao Daily News, and The China Press. Of these four, three are either directly or indirectly controlled by the government of Mainland China, while the fourth (run out of Taiwan) has recently begun bowing to pressure from the Beijing government.Other scholars and journalists have noted pro-Chinese Communist Party content in The China Press.

See also 

 SinoVision
 China News Service

References

External links
  

Newspapers published in New York City
Non-English-language newspapers published in New York (state)
Chinese-language newspapers published in the United States
Chinese-language newspapers (Simplified Chinese)
Organizations associated with the Chinese Communist Party
United front (China)